Episcepsis luctuosa is a moth of the family Erebidae. It was described by Heinrich Benno Möschler in 1877. It is found in Venezuela, Suriname and northern Brazil.

References

Euchromiina
Moths described in 1877